Ross Melvin Dick (October 4, 1912 – February 3, 1994) helped found the Society of American Business Editors and Writers and served as the organization's fourth president.

Early life 
Dick was born on October 4, 1912 in Moline, Illinois, to Frances and Ross C. Dick. Ross, born January 21, 1884, in East Moline, was a machinist for Root & Vandervoort. Dick had a brother, Ronald R., and a sister, Barbara. Barbara was born on November 26, 1922, in Moline.

In 1923 the family moved to Clinton, Iowa, when Ross joined the Climax Engineering Company as a production engineer. They moved to Beloit, Wisconsin by 1926.

Dick graduated from Beloit College in 1937, where he was a member of the Sigma Alpha Epsilon fraternity.

Career 
Dick began his journalism career as the Beloit correspondent for the Star and Register-Republic in Rockford, Illinois.

Dick joined The Milwaukee Journal in 1946, serving as the state news editor before becoming the business and financial editor later that year. He retired in 1978.

Dick helped found the Society for Advancing Business Editing and Writing. He served as the organization's treasurer in 1967, and fourth president in 1968.

Dick and his wife, Shirley, traveled around South America on a Wisconsin trade mission in the 1960s.

Personal life 
Dick married Shirley Kretschmer on July 21, 1940, in the Delta Gamma sorority house at Beloit College in a ceremony presided over by college president Irving Maurer. Shirley, born on July 21, 1914, graduated from Beloit College in 1936 with one of the first bachelor's degrees in archaeology/anthropology awarded to a woman in the United States.

The couple lived in Dick's Rockford apartment until they moved to Milwaukee, Wisconsin, when Dick started at the Journal in 1946. They moved to Whitefish Bay, Wisconsin, in 1953.

The couple had three children – daughters Susan and Mary, and son Ross.

Dick died on February 3, 1994. Shirley died on April 12, 2016, in Waupaca, Wisconsin.

References 

American male journalists
American newspaper editors
Journalists from Illinois
People from Moline, Illinois
Milwaukee Journal Sentinel people
1912 births
1994 deaths
20th-century American journalists